Franco Vescovi (28 January 1930 – 20 February 2006) was an Italian boxer. He competed in the men's welterweight event at the 1952 Summer Olympics.

References

1930 births
2006 deaths
Italian male boxers
Olympic boxers of Italy
Boxers at the 1952 Summer Olympics
Boxers from Rome
Welterweight boxers